Sobirjon Safaroliev (born 2 May 2002) is an Uzbekistani rower. He competed in the 2020 Summer Olympics.

References

2002 births
Living people
Uzbekistani male rowers
Olympic rowers of Uzbekistan
Rowers at the 2020 Summer Olympics
People from Samarkand